Galium verrucosum, common name warty bedstraw (US) or southern cleavers (UK), is a species of plants in the Rubiaceae. The epithet "verrucosum" means "warty" in reference to the numerous bumps on the mature fruit. It is native to the Mediterranean Basin from Portugal and Morocco to Turkey and Palestine. It is reportedly naturalized in Great Britain, Central Europe (from Switzerland to Poland), the Canary Islands, Madeira, and Wayne County (Michigan).

References

External links
Waste, Guía de Plantas, Galium verrucosum
Flowers in Israel, Warty bedstraw, Southern cleavers, דבקת הפטמות Galium verrucosum
Flore Alpes Gaillet halophile
Flora Vascular de Andalucía Occidental, Galium verrucosum 
Wild Plants of Malta and Gozo, southern cleavers

verrucosum
Flora of Europe
Flora of Africa
Flora of Turkey
Flora of Palestine (region)
Flora of Michigan
Plants described in 1767
Flora without expected TNC conservation status